An interview is a structured conversation where one participant asks questions, and the other provides answers. In common parlance, the word "interview" refers to a one-on-one conversation between an interviewer and an interviewee.  The interviewer asks questions to which the interviewee responds, usually providing information.  That information may be used or provided to other audiences immediately or later.  This feature is common to many types of interviews – a job interview or interview with a witness to an event may have no other audience present at the time, but the answers will be later provided to others in the employment or investigative process. An interview may also transfer information in both directions.

Interviews usually take place face-to-face, in person, but the parties may instead be separated geographically, as in videoconferencing or telephone interviews.  Interviews almost always involve spoken conversation between two or more parties.  In some instances a "conversation" can happen between two persons who type their questions and answers.

Interviews can be unstructured, free-wheeling and open-ended conversations without predetermined plan or prearranged questions. One form of unstructured interview is a focused interview in which the interviewer consciously and consistently guides the conversation so that the interviewee's responses do not stray from the main research topic or idea. Interviews can also be highly structured conversations in which specific questions occur in a specified order.  They can follow diverse formats; for example, in a ladder interview, a respondent's answers typically guide subsequent interviews, with the object being to explore a respondent's subconscious motives.  Typically the interviewer has some way of recording the information that is gleaned from the interviewee, often by keeping notes with a pencil and paper, or with a video or audio recorder.  Interviews usually have a limited duration, with a beginning and an ending.

The traditionally two-person interview format, sometimes called a one-on-one interview, permits direct questions and follow-ups, which enables an interviewer to better gauge the accuracy and relevance of responses.  It is a flexible arrangement in the sense that subsequent questions can be tailored to clarify earlier answers.  Further, it eliminates possible distortion due to other parties being present.

Face to face interviewing helps both parties to interact and form a connection, and understand the other.  Further, face to face interview sessions can be more enjoyable.

Contexts 

Interviews can happen in a wide variety of contexts:

 Employment. A job interview is a formal consultation for evaluating the qualifications of the interviewee for a specific position.  One type of job interview is a case interview in which the applicant is presented with a question or task or challenge, and asked to resolve the situation.  Candidates may be treated to a mock interview as a training exercise to prepare the respondent to handle questions in the subsequent 'real' interview.  A series of interviews may be arranged, with the first interview sometimes being a short screening interview, followed by more in-depth interviews, usually by company personnel who can ultimately hire the applicant.  Technology has enabled new possibilities for interviewing; for example, video telephony has enabled inteviewing applicants from afar.
 Psychology. Psychologists use a variety of interviewing methods and techniques to try to understand and help their patients. In a psychiatric interview, a psychiatrist or psychologist or nurse asks a battery of questions to complete what is called a psychiatric assessment. Sometimes two people are interviewed by an interviewer, with one format being called couple interviews. Criminologists and detectives sometimes use cognitive interviews on eyewitnesses and victims to try to ascertain what can be recalled specifically from a crime scene, hopefully before the specific memories begin to fade in the mind.
 Marketing and Academic. In marketing research and academic research, interviews are used in a wide variety of ways as a method to do extensive personality tests. Interviews are the most used form of data collection in qualitative research. Interviews are used in marketing research as a tool that a firm may utilize to gain an understanding of how consumers think. Consumer research firms sometimes use computer-assisted telephone interviewing to randomly dial phone numbers to conduct highly structured telephone interviews, with scripted questions and responses entered directly into the computer.
 Journalism and other media. Typically, reporters covering a story in journalism conduct interviews over the phone and in person to gain information for subsequent publication. Reporters also interview government officials and political candidates for broadcast. In a talk show, a radio or television "host" interviews one or more people, with the topic usually chosen by the host, sometimes for the purposes of entertainment, sometimes for informational purposes.  Such interviews are often recorded.
 Other situations. Sometimes college representatives or alumni conduct college interviews with prospective students as a way of assessing a student's suitability while offering the student a chance to learn more about a college. Some services specialize in coaching people for interviews. Embassy officials may conduct interviews with applicants for student visas before approving their visa applications. Interviewing in legal contexts is often called interrogation. Debriefing is another kind of interview.

Blind interview
In a blind interview the identity of the interviewee is concealed so as to reduce interviewer bias. Blind interviews are sometimes used in the software industry and are standard in orchestral auditions. Blind interviews have been shown in some cases to increase the hiring of minorities and women.

Interviewer bias 
The relationship between the interviewer and interviewee in research settings can have both positive and negative consequences. Their relationship can bring deeper understanding of the information being collected, however this creates a risk that the interviewer will be unable to be unbiased in their collection and interpretation of information. Bias can be created from the interviewers perception of the interviewee, or from the interviewee's perception of the interviewer. Additionally,  a researcher can bring biases to the table based on the researcher’s mental state, their preparedness for conducting the research, and the researcher conducting inappropriate interviews. Interviewers can use various practices known in qualitative research to mitigate interviewer bias. These practices include subjectivity, objectivity, and reflexivity. Each of these practices allows the interviewer, or researcher, the opportunity to use their bias to enhance their work by gaining a deeper understanding of the problem they are studying.

See also 
 Repertory grid interview
In research
 Telephone interview
 Computer assisted telephone interviewing
 Interview (research)
 Knowledge transfer
 Online interview
 Mall intercept interview
 Qualitative research interview
 Structured interview
 Unstructured interview
In journalism and media
 Interview (journalism)
 Talk show
In other contexts
 College interview
 Reference interview, between a librarian and a library user

References

Survey methodology